Kozara is a mountain in western Bosnia and Herzegovina, in the town of Kozarac and in the Bosanska Krajina region, bounded by the Sava River to the north, the Vrbas to the east, the Sana to the south, and the Una to the west. Its tallest peak is Lisina (978 m). In 1942 Kozara was the site of the Kozara Offensive, part of the Yugoslav National Liberation War and Partisan resistance during World War II.

Peaks

See also
Kozara National Park
List of mountains in Bosnia and Herzegovina

References

Mountains of Bosnia and Herzegovina
Mountains of Republika Srpska